Waringstown Cricket Club is a cricket club in Waringstown, County Down, Northern Ireland, playing in the NCU Premier League.

The club was formed in 1851 by Captain Thomas Waring and the Henning brothers, John and George, presumably from the linen factory of John Henning & Co. in the Waringstown village. The Lawn is believed to be the second oldest cricket ground in Ulster. Waringstown was a founder member of the NCU Senior League in 1897.

Honours
Irish Senior Cup: 6
1983, 1992, 2011, 2015, 2017, 2018
Ulster Cup: 1
 2017
NCU Senior League: 31 (6 shared)
1911, 1924, 1925, 1944, 1949, 1953, 1967, 1970 (shared), 1971 (shared), 1972, 1973, 1976, 1977, 1978, 1979, 1981, 1982, 1984, 1985, 1988, 1989 (shared), 1991, 1992, 2000, 2005 (shared), 2006, 2009 (shared), 2013 (shared), 2015, 2017, 2021
NCU Challenge Cup: 26
1914, 1921, 1943, 1944, 1965, 1967, 1968, 1970, 1971, 1973, 1974, 1975, 1976, 1978, 1979, 1983, 1986, 1987, 1988, 1992, 1993, 1995, 2006, 2011, 2013, 2018.  
NCU T20 Cup: 4 
2007, 2012, 2016, 2017
NCU Junior Cup: †2
†1997, †2002

† Won by 2nd XI

References

External links
Waringstown Cricket Club

Cricket clubs in County Down
NCU Senior League members
1851 establishments in Ireland
Cricket clubs in Northern Ireland